The Peiratinae are a subfamily of assassin bugs (Reduviidae) known as corsairs. The subfamily has a worldwide distribution, but is concentrated in tropical areas. About 30 genera with 350 species are described. 

Peirates Serville sensu stricto is one of the largest genera of Peiratinae with about 40 valid species worldwide, mainly distributed in the Oriental, Palearctic and Ethiopian regions. After 1831, the subfamily changed many times as new species were being discovered. The Peirates Serville sensu stricto is the one of the 40 that has been identified to have a very different biology. Of the 30-40 known genera, Sirthenea is found on all continents.

Selected genera
Eidmannia Taeuber, 1934
Melanolestes Stål, 1866
Phorastes Kirkaldy, 1900
Rasahus Amyot and Serville, 1843
Sirthenea Spinola, 1840
Thymbreus Stål, 1859
Tydides Stål, 1865

References

Further reading

Reduviidae
Hemiptera subfamilies